The 2020–21 Milwaukee Bucks season was the 53rd season of the franchise in the National Basketball Association (NBA). On April 30, 2021, the Bucks clinched the Central Division for a record 10th time with a win over the Chicago Bulls. The Bucks finished the season with a 46–26 record (equal to 52 wins in an 82-game season), good enough for the third seed. The Bucks began their playoff run by sweeping the sixth-seeded Miami Heat in the opening round, in a rematch of the Eastern Conference Semi-finals the previous year. The Bucks then defeated the second-seeded Brooklyn Nets in the Eastern Conference Semi-finals in seven games. In the Eastern Conference Finals, the Bucks defeated the Atlanta Hawks in six games, reaching the NBA Finals for the first time in 47 years, and winning the Eastern Conference Finals for the first time in franchise history. The Bucks are the first NBA team to have won both a Western Conference and Eastern Conference championship in their history, as they were in the Western Conference when they reached the NBA Finals in 1971 and 1974. The Bucks would face the Phoenix Suns in the NBA Finals. Despite losing the first two games, the Bucks won four straight, winning 4–2 and clinching their second NBA title, the first since 1971.

Draft picks

Roster

Standings

Division

Conference

Notes
 z – Clinched home court advantage for the entire playoffs
 c – Clinched home court advantage for the conference playoffs
 y – Clinched division title
 x – Clinched playoff spot

Game log

Preseason

|-style="background:#fcc;"
| 1
| December 12
| Dallas
| 
| Giannis Antetokounmpo (25)
| Bobby Portis (12)
| Bobby Portis (13)
| Fiserv Forum
| 0–1
|-style="background:#fcc;"
| 2
| December 14
| Dallas
| 
| Giannis Antetokounmpo (24)
| Giannis Antetokounmpo (14)
| Augustin, Holiday (6)
| Fiserv Forum
| 0–2
|-style="background:#fcc;"
| 3
| December 18
| @ New Orleans
| 
| Khris Middleton (29)
| Donte DiVincenzo (8)
| Jrue Holiday (5)
| Smoothie King Center
| 0–3

Regular season

|-style="background:#fcc;"
| 1
| December 23
| @ Boston
| 
| Giannis Antetokounmpo (35)
| Khris Middleton (14)
| Khris Middleton (8)
| TD Garden0
| 0–1
|-style="background:#cfc;"
| 2
| December 25
| Golden State
| 
| Khris Middleton (31)
| Giannis Antetokounmpo (13)
| Jrue Holiday (6)
| Fiserv Forum0
| 1–1
|-style="background:#fcc;"
| 3
| December 27
| @ New York
| 
| Giannis Antetokounmpo (27)
| Giannis Antetokounmpo (13)
| Antetokounmpo, Holiday, Middleton (5)
| Madison Square Garden0
| 1–2
|- style="background:#cfc;"
| 4
| December 29
| @ Miami
| 
| Khris Middleton (25)
| Bobby Portis (9)
| Jrue Holiday (7)
| American Airlines Arena0
| 2–2
|- style="background:#fcc;"
| 5
| December 30
| @ Miami
| 
| Giannis Antetokounmpo (26)
| Giannis Antetokounmpo (13)
| Giannis Antetokounmpo (10)
| American Airlines Arena0
| 2–3

|- style="background:#cfc;"
| 6
| January 1
| Chicago
| 
| Giannis Antetokounmpo (29)
| Antetokounmpo, Portis (12)
| Giannis Antetokounmpo (8)
| Fiserv Forum0 
| 3–3
|- style="background:#cfc;"
| 7
| January 4
| Detroit
| 
| Giannis Antetokounmpo (43)
| Antetokounmpo, Middleton (9)
| Donte DiVincenzo (9)
| Fiserv Forum0 
| 4–3
|- style="background:#cfc;"
| 8
| January 6
| Detroit
| 
| Giannis Antetokounmpo (25)
| Bobby Portis (10)
| Khris Middleton (7)
| Fiserv Forum0
| 5–3
|-style="background:#fcc;"
| 9
| January 8
| Utah
| 
| Giannis Antetokounmpo (35)
| Khris Middleton (10)
| Bobby Portis (8)
| Fiserv Forum0
| 5–4
|- style="background:#cfc;"
| 10
| January 9
| Cleveland
| 
| Khris Middleton (27)
| Bobby Portis (11)
| Khris Middleton (6)
| Fiserv Forum0
| 6–4
|- style="background:#cfc;"
| 11
| January 11
| @ Orlando
| 
| Giannis Antetokounmpo (22)
| Khris Middleton (10)
| Antetokounmpo, Augustin (4)
| Amway Center0
| 7–4
|- style="background:#cfc;"
| 12
| January 13
| @ Detroit
| 
| Giannis Antetokounmpo (22)
| Brook Lopez (11)
| Giannis Antetokounmpo (10)
| Little Caesars Arena0
| 8–4
|- style="background:#cfc;"
| 13
| January 15
| Dallas
| 
| Giannis Antetokounmpo (31)
| Bobby Portis (13)
| Khris Middleton (6)
| Fiserv Forum0
| 9–4
|- style="background:#fcc;"
| 14
| January 18
| @ Brooklyn
| 
| Giannis Antetokounmpo (34)
| Giannis Antetokounmpo (12)
| Giannis Antetokounmpo (7)
| Barclays Center0
| 9–5
|- style="background:#fcc;"
| 15
| January 21
| L. A. Lakers
| 
| Giannis Antetokounmpo (25)
| Giannis Antetokounmpo (12)
| Holiday, Middleton (7)
| Fiserv Forum0
| 9–6
|- style="background:#ccc;"
| –
| January 22
| Washington
| colspan="6" | Postponed (COVID-19) (Makeup date: May 5)
|- style="background:#cfc;"
| 16
| January 24
| Atlanta
| 
| Giannis Antetokounmpo (27)
| Giannis Antetokounmpo (14)
| Giannis Antetokounmpo (8)
| Fiserv Forum0
| 10–6
|- style="background:#cfc;"
| 17
| January 27
| @ Toronto
| 
| Antetokounmpo, Middleton (24)
| Giannis Antetokounmpo (18)
| Giannis Antetokounmpo (9)
| Amalie Arena0
| 11–6
|- style="background:#fcc;"
| 18
| January 29
| @ New Orleans
| 
| Giannis Antetokounmpo (38)
| Giannis Antetokounmpo (11)
| Khris Middleton (8)
| Smoothie King Center0
| 11–7
|- style="background:#fcc;"
| 19
| January 30
| @ Charlotte
| 
| Giannis Antetokounmpo (34)
| Giannis Antetokounmpo (18)
| Giannis Antetokounmpo (9)
| Spectrum Center0
| 11–8

|- style="background:#cfc;"
| 20
| February 1
| Portland
| 
| Jrue Holiday (22)
| Bobby Portis (8)
| Khris Middleton (9)
| Fiserv Forum0
| 12–8
|- style="background:#cfc;"
| 21
| February 3
| Indiana
| 
| Giannis Antetokounmpo (21)
| Giannis Antetokounmpo (14)
| Giannis Antetokounmpo (10)
| Fiserv Forum0
| 13–8
|- style="background:#cfc;"
| 22
| February 5
| @ Cleveland
| 
| Giannis Antetokounmpo (33)
| Giannis Antetokounmpo (12)
| Jrue Holiday (7)
| Rocket Mortgage FieldHouse0
| 14–8
|- style="background:#cfc;"
| 23
| February 6
| @ Cleveland
| 
| Giannis Antetokounmpo (24)
| Giannis Antetokounmpo (11)
| Giannis Antetokounmpo (11)
| Rocket Mortgage FieldHouse0
| 15–8
|- style="background:#cfc;"
| 24
| February 8
| @ Denver
| 
| Giannis Antetokounmpo (30)
| Giannis Antetokounmpo (9)
| Khris Middleton (12)
| Ball Arena0
| 16–8
|- style="background:#fcc;"
| 25
| February 10
| @ Phoenix
| 
| Giannis Antetokounmpo (47)
| Giannis Antetokounmpo (11)
| Khris Middleton (11)
| Phoenix Suns Arena0
| 16–9
|- style="background:#fcc;"
| 26
| February 12
| @ Utah
| 
| Giannis Antetokounmpo (29)
| Giannis Antetokounmpo (15)
| Giannis Antetokounmpo (6)
| Vivint Smart Home Arena3,902
| 16–10
|- style="background:#fcc;"
| 27
| February 14
| @ Oklahoma City
| 
| Giannis Antetokounmpo (24)
| Giannis Antetokounmpo (17)
| Giannis Antetokounmpo (10)
| Chesapeake Energy Arena0
| 16–11
|- style="background:#fcc;"
| 28
| February 16
| Toronto
| 
| Giannis Antetokounmpo (34)
| Giannis Antetokounmpo (10)
| Antetokounmpo, DiVincenzo (8)
| Fiserv Forum250
| 16–12
|- style="background:#fcc;"
| 29
| February 18
| Toronto
| 
| Giannis Antetokounmpo (23)
| Giannis Antetokounmpo (12)
| Giannis Antetokounmpo (8)
| Fiserv Forum500
| 16–13
|- style="background:#cfc;"
| 30
| February 19
| Oklahoma City
| 
| Giannis Antetokounmpo (29)
| Giannis Antetokounmpo (19)
| Giannis Antetokounmpo (8)
| Fiserv Forum750
| 17–13
|- style="background:#cfc;"
| 31
| February 21
| Sacramento
| 
| Giannis Antetokounmpo (38)
| Giannis Antetokounmpo (18)
| Khris Middleton (6)
| Fiserv Forum1,800
| 18–13
|- style="background:#cfc;"
| 32
| February 23
| Minnesota
| 
| Giannis Antetokounmpo (37)
| G. Antetokounmpo, T. Antetokounmpo (8)
| Giannis Antetokounmpo (8)
| Fiserv Forum1,800
| 19–13
|- style="background:#cfc;"
| 33
| February 25
| New Orleans
| 
| Giannis Antetokounmpo (38)
| Giannis Antetokounmpo (10)
| Donte DiVincenzo (9)
| Fiserv Forum1,800
| 20–13
|- style="background:#cfc;"
| 34
| February 28
| L. A. Clippers
| 
| Giannis Antetokounmpo (36)
| Giannis Antetokounmpo (14)
| Khris Middleton (8)
| Fiserv Forum1,800
| 21–13

|- style="background:#fcc;"
| 35
| March 2
| Denver
| 
| Giannis Antetokounmpo (27)
| Antetokounmpo, Connaughton (8)
| Khris Middleton (6)
| Fiserv Forum1,800
| 21–14
|- style="background:#cfc;"
| 36
| March 4
| @ Memphis
| 
| Giannis Antetokounmpo (26)
| Giannis Antetokounmpo (11)
| Giannis Antetokounmpo (8)
| FedExForum1,961
| 22–14
|- style="background:#bcf;"
| ASG
| March 7
| Team LeBron @ Team Durant
| 
| Giannis Antetokounmpo (35)
| Chris Paul (8) Giannis Antetokounmpo (7)
| Chris Paul (16) Giannis Antetokounmpo (3)
| State Farm Arena0
| 1–0
|- style="background:#cfc;"
| 37
| March 11
| New York
| 
| Giannis Antetokounmpo (24)
| Giannis Antetokounmpo (10)
| Giannis Antetokounmpo (10)
| Fiserv Forum1,800
| 23–14
|- style="background:#cfc;"
| 38
| March 13
| @ Washington
| 
| Giannis Antetokounmpo (33)
| Donte DiVincenzo (13)
| Giannis Antetokounmpo (11)
| Capital One Arena0
| 24–14
|- style="background:#cfc;"
| 39
| March 15
| @ Washington
| 
| Giannis Antetokounmpo (31)
| Giannis Antetokounmpo (15)
| Giannis Antetokounmpo (10)
| Capital One Arena0
| 25–14
|- style="background:#cfc;"
| 40
| March 17
| @ Philadelphia
| 
| Giannis Antetokounmpo (32)
| Giannis Antetokounmpo (15)
| Jrue Holiday (6)
| Wells Fargo Center3,071
| 26–14
|- style="background:#cfc;"
| 41
| March 20
| San Antonio
| 
| Giannis Antetokounmpo (26)
| Donte DiVincenzo (13)
| Giannis Antetokounmpo (15)
| Fiserv Forum3,280
| 27–14
|- style="background:#cfc;"
| 42
| March 22
| Indiana
| 
| Jrue Holiday (28)
| Donte DiVincenzo (13)
| Jrue Holiday (14)
| Fiserv Forum3,280
| 28–14
|- style="background:#cfc;"
| 43
| March 24
| Boston
| 
| Khris Middleton (27)
| Khris Middleton (13)
| Giannis Antetokounmpo (7)
| Fiserv Forum3,280
| 29–14
|- style="background:#fcc;"
| 44
| March 26
| Boston
| 
| Khris Middleton (19)
| Pat Connaughton (11)
| Giannis Antetokounmpo (5)
| Fiserv Forum3,280
| 29–15
|- style="background:#fcc;"
| 45
| March 27
| New York
| 
| Thanasis Antetokounmpo (23)
| T. Antetokounmpo, Lopez, Nwora (10)
| T. Antetokounmpo, Merrill (5)
| Fiserv Forum3,280
| 29–16
|- style="background:#fcc;"
| 46
| March 29
| @ L. A. Clippers
| 
| Giannis Antetokounmpo (32)
| Pat Connaughton (7)
| Jrue Holiday (7)
| Staples Center0
| 29–17
|- style="background:#cfc;"
| 47
| March 31
| @ L. A. Lakers
| 
| Jrue Holiday (28)
| Giannis Antetokounmpo (10)
| Khris Middleton (8)
| Staples Center0
| 30–17

|- style="background:#cfc;"
| 48
| April 2
| @ Portland
| 
| Giannis Antetokounmpo (47)
| Giannis Antetokounmpo (12)
| Jrue Holiday (10)
| Moda Center0
| 31–17
|- style="background:#cfc;"
| 49
| April 3
| @ Sacramento
| 
| Jrue Holiday (33)
| Donte DiVincenzo (14)
| Jrue Holiday (11)
| Golden 1 Center0
| 32–17
|- style="background:#fcc;"
| 50
| April 6
| @ Golden State
| 
| Jrue Holiday (29)
| Bobby Portis (13)
| Khris Middleton (7)
| Chase Center0
| 32–18
|- style="background:#fcc;"
| 51
| April 8
| @ Dallas
| 
| Donte DiVincenzo (22)
| Bobby Portis (14)
| Holiday, Middleton, Teague (3)
| American Airlines Center4,190
| 32–19
|- style="background:#fcc;"
| 52
| April 9
| Charlotte
| 
| Jordan Nwora (24)
| Bobby Portis (13)
| Jeff Teague (6)
| Fiserv Forum3,280
| 32–20
|- style="background:#cfc;"
| 53
| April 11
| @ Orlando
| 
| Khris Middleton (21)
| Bobby Portis (10)
| Jrue Holiday (7)
| Amway Center3,316
| 33–20
|- style="background:#cfc;"
| 54
| April 14
| @ Minnesota
| 
| Khris Middleton (27)
| Lopez, Middleton (8)
| Khris Middleton (7)
| Target Center0
| 34–20
|- style="background:#cfc;"
| 55
| April 15
| @ Atlanta
| 
| Jrue Holiday (23)
| Brook Lopez (12)
| Holiday, Middleton (7)
| State Farm Arena0
| 35–20
|- style="background:#fcc;"
| 56
| April 17
| Memphis
| 
| Giannis Antetokounmpo (28)
| Giannis Antetokounmpo (11)
| Khris Middleton (10)
| Fiserv Forum3,280
| 35–21
|- style="background:#fcc;"
| 57
| April 19
| Phoenix
| 
| Giannis Antetokounmpo (33)
| Pat Connaughton (9)
| Jrue Holiday (8)
| Fiserv Forum3,280
| 35–22
|- style="background:#cfc;"
| 58
| April 22
| Philadelphia
| 
| Giannis Antetokounmpo (27)
| Giannis Antetokounmpo (16)
| Jrue Holiday (11)
| Fiserv Forum3,280
| 36–22
|- style="background:#cfc;"
| 59
| April 24
| Philadelphia
| 
| Giannis Antetokounmpo (24)
| Giannis Antetokounmpo (14)
| Jeff Teague (8)
| Fiserv Forum3,280
| 37–22
|- style="background:#fcc;"
| 60
| April 25
| @ Atlanta
| 
| Giannis Antetokounmpo (31)
| Giannis Antetokounmpo (14)
| Jrue Holiday (11)
| State Farm Arena3,010
| 37–23
|- style="background:#cfc;"
| 61
| April 27
| @ Charlotte
| 
| Giannis Antetokounmpo (29)
| Giannis Antetokounmpo (12)
| Giannis Antetokounmpo (8)
| Spectrum Center3,240
| 38–23
|- style="background:#fcc;"
| 62
| April 29
| @ Houston
| 
| Khris Middleton (33)
| Bobby Portis (11)
| Jrue Holiday (10)
| Toyota Center3,232
| 38–24
|- style="background:#cfc;"
| 63
| April 30
| @ Chicago
| 
| Lopez, Middleton (22)
| Bobby Portis (14)
| Jrue Holiday (7)
| United Center0
| 39–24

|- style="background:#cfc;"
| 64
| May 2
| Brooklyn
| 
| Giannis Antetokounmpo (49)
| Khris Middleton (11)
| Khris Middleton (6)
| Fiserv Forum3,280
| 40–24
|- style="background:#cfc;"
| 65
| May 4
| Brooklyn
| 
| Giannis Antetokounmpo (36)
| Donte DiVincenzo (15)
| Jrue Holiday (10)
| Fiserv Forum3,280
| 41–24
|- style="background:#cfc;"
| 66
| May 5
| Washington
| 
| Jrue Holiday (29)
| Giannis Antetokounmpo (9)
| Giannis Antetokounmpo (8)
| Fiserv Forum3,280
| 42–24
|- style="background:#cfc;"
| 67
| May 7
| Houston
| 
| Brook Lopez (24)
| Giannis Antetokounmpo (11)
| Jrue Holiday (8)
| Fiserv Forum3,280
| 43–24
|- style="background:#fcc;"
| 68
| May 10
| @ San Antonio
| 
| Giannis Antetokounmpo (28)
| Khris Middleton (7)
| DiVincenzo, Holiday (6)
| AT&T Center3,992
| 43–25
|- style="background:#cfc;"
| 69
| May 11
| Orlando
| 
| Giannis Antetokounmpo (27)
| Bobby Portis (15)
| G. Antetokounmpo, Middleton (5)
| Fiserv Forum3,280
| 44–25
|- style="background:#cfc;"
| 70
| May 13
| @ Indiana
| 
| Giannis Antetokounmpo (40)
| Giannis Antetokounmpo (15)
| Jrue Holiday (14)
| Bankers Life Fieldhouse0
| 45–25
|- style="background:#cfc;"
| 71
| May 15
| Miami
| 
| Forbes, Middleton (21)
| G. Antetokounmpo, DiVincenzo (9)
| Jrue Holiday (10)
| Fiserv Forum3,280
| 46–25
|- style="background:#fcc;"
| 72
| May 16
| @ Chicago
| 
| Jordan Nwora (34)
| Jordan Nwora (14)
| Jeff Teague (7)
| United Center3,427
| 46–26

Playoffs 

|-style="background:#cfc;"
| 1
| May 22
| Miami
| 
| Khris Middleton (27)
| Giannis Antetokounmpo (18)
| Khris Middleton (6)
| Fiserv Forum9,107
| 1–0
|-style="background:#cfc;"
| 2
| May 24
| Miami
| 
| Giannis Antetokounmpo (31)
| Giannis Antetokounmpo (13)
| Jrue Holiday (15)
| Fiserv Forum9,107
| 2–0
|-style="background:#cfc;"
| 3
| May 27
| @ Miami
| 
| Khris Middleton (22)
| Giannis Antetokounmpo (17)
| Jrue Holiday (12)
| American Airlines Arena17,000
| 3–0
|-style="background:#cfc;"
| 4
| May 29
| @ Miami
| 
| Brook Lopez (25)
| Giannis Antetokounmpo (12)
| Giannis Antetokounmpo (15)
| American Airlines Arena17,000
| 4–0

|-style="background:#fcc;"
| 1
| June 5
| @ Brooklyn
| 
| Giannis Antetokounmpo (34)
| Khris Middleton (13)
| Jrue Holiday (6)
| Barclays Center15,750
| 0–1
|-style="background:#fcc;"
| 2
| June 7
| @ Brooklyn
| 
| Giannis Antetokounmpo (18)
| Giannis Antetokounmpo (11)
| Giannis Antetokounmpo (4)
| Barclays Center15,776
| 0–2
|-style="background:#cfc;"
| 3
| June 10
| Brooklyn
| 
| Khris Middleton (35)
| Khris Middleton (15)
| Jrue Holiday (5)
| Fiserv Forum16,310
| 1–2
|-style="background:#cfc;"
| 4
| June 13
| Brooklyn
| 
| Giannis Antetokounmpo (34)
| Giannis Antetokounmpo (12)
| Jrue Holiday (9)
| Fiserv Forum16,310
| 2–2
|-style="background:#fcc;"
| 5
| June 15
| @ Brooklyn
| 
| Giannis Antetokounmpo (34)
| Giannis Antetokounmpo (12)
| Jrue Holiday (8)
| Barclays Center16,067
| 2–3
|-style="background:#cfc;"
| 6
| June 17
| Brooklyn
| 
| Khris Middleton (38)
| Giannis Antetokounmpo (17)
| Holiday, Middleton (5)
| Fiserv Forum16,310
| 3–3
|-style="background:#cfc;"
| 7
| June 19
| @ Brooklyn
| 
| Giannis Antetokounmpo (40)
| Giannis Antetokounmpo (13)
| Jrue Holiday (8)
| Barclays Center16,287
| 4–3

|-style="background:#fcc;"
| 1
| June 23
| Atlanta
| 
| Giannis Antetokounmpo (34)
| Giannis Antetokounmpo (12)
| Jrue Holiday (10)
| Fiserv Forum16,310
| 0–1
|-style="background:#cfc;"
| 2
| June 25
| Atlanta
| 
| Giannis Antetokounmpo (25)
| Giannis Antetokounmpo (9)
| Khris Middleton (8)
| Fiserv Forum16,422
| 1–1
|-style="background:#cfc;"
| 3
| June 27
| @ Atlanta
| 
| Khris Middleton (38)
| Antetokounmpo, Middleton (11)
| Jrue Holiday (12)
| State Farm Arena16,650
| 2–1
|-style="background:#fcc;"
| 4
| June 29
| @ Atlanta
| 
| Jrue Holiday (19)
| Giannis Antetokounmpo (8)
| Jrue Holiday (9)
| State Farm Arena16,478
| 2–2
|-style="background:#cfc;"
| 5
| July 1
| Atlanta
| 
| Brook Lopez (33)
| Khris Middleton (13)
| Jrue Holiday (13)
| Fiserv Forum16,389
| 3–2
|-style="background:#cfc;"
| 6
| July 3
| @ Atlanta
| 
| Khris Middleton (32)
| Holiday, Portis (9)
| Jrue Holiday (9)
| State Farm Arena16,620
| 4–2

|-style="background:#fcc;"
| 1
| July 6
| @ Phoenix
| 
| Khris Middleton (29)
| Giannis Antetokounmpo (17)
| Jrue Holiday (9)
| Phoenix Suns Arena16,557
| 0–1
|-style="background:#fcc;"
| 2
| July 8
| @ Phoenix
| 
| Giannis Antetokounmpo (42)
| Giannis Antetokounmpo (12)
| Khris Middleton (8)
| Phoenix Suns Arena16,583
| 0–2
|-style="background:#cfc;"
| 3
| July 11
| Phoenix
| 
| Giannis Antetokounmpo (41)
| Giannis Antetokounmpo (13)
| Jrue Holiday (9)
| Fiserv Forum16,637
| 1–2
|-style="background:#cfc;"
| 4
| July 14
| Phoenix
| 
| Khris Middleton (40)
| Giannis Antetokounmpo (14)
| Giannis Antetokounmpo (8)
| Fiserv Forum16,911
| 2–2
|-style="background:#cfc;"
| 5
| July 17
| @ Phoenix
| 
| Giannis Antetokounmpo (32)
| Giannis Antetokounmpo (9)
| Jrue Holiday (13)
| Footprint Center16,562
| 3–2
|-style="background:#cfc;"
| 6
| July 20
| Phoenix
| 
| Giannis Antetokounmpo (50)
| Giannis Antetokounmpo (14)
| Jrue Holiday (11)
| Fiserv Forum17,397
| 4–2

Transactions

Trades

Failed Bogdan Bogdanović trade
In November 2020, the Bucks attempted to acquire Bogdan Bogdanović through a sign-and-trade deal along with Justin James from the Sacramento Kings for Donte DiVincenzo, D. J. Wilson, and Ersan İlyasova. The trade unraveled when the NBA announced they were investigating the Bucks for having contact with Bogdanović and/or his agent before it was allowed under free agency rules. The Bucks reportedly felt double-crossed by the situation, and decided not to pursue the trade further. The league voided the team's second-round pick in 2022 at the conclusion of the investigation in December. According to Bogdanović, he was not aware of the trade and felt betrayed by the Kings. DiVincenzo and Wilson stayed with the Bucks and İlyasova was eventually waived. Bogdanović would sign with the Atlanta Hawks as a restricted free agent, after the Kings extended his qualifying offer. Coincidentally, the Kings and Bucks would be able to make a successful trade during the following season, where the Kings successfully acquired DiVincenzo in a four-team trade.

Free agency

Re-signed

Additions

Subtractions

Notes

References

Milwaukee Bucks seasons
Milwaukee Bucks
Milwaukee Bucks
Milwaukee Bucks
Eastern Conference (NBA) championship seasons
NBA championship seasons